Derreck is a given name. Notable people with the name include:

 Derreck Brooks (born 1994), American basketball player
 Derreck Calvert (1919-2003), Australian cricketer
 Derreck Kayongo (born 1970), Ugandan entrepreneur and human rights innovator
 Derreck Robinson (born 1982), American football player